Telelove is the debut solo album by Suze DeMarchi, lead singer of Australian band the Baby Animals, released in March 1999.

Track listing 
All tracks written by Suze DeMarchi, Dave Rankin and Eddie Parise unless otherwise noted.

 "Karma" - 4:15
 "Satellite" (Suze DeMarchi, Dave Rankin) - 4:22
 "Open Windows" (Suze DeMarchi, Nuno Bettencourt) - 4:36
 "Mainline" (Suze DeMarchi, Dave Rankin) - 4:36
 "Telelove" (Suze DeMarchi, Nuno Bettencourt) - 4:39
 "Psychic" - 5:24
 "Down" - 3:09
 "Colour of Love" (Nuno Bettencourt) - 5:23
 "Fresh" - 4:48
 "Trapped in Amber" - 3:46
 "Submarine" (Suze DeMarchi, Dave Rankin, Nuno Bettencourt) - 5:22

Charts

Personnel
 Jose Barros - Hammond
 Nuno Bettencourt - Guitar (Acoustic), Guitar, Mellotron, Bass, Vocals  
 Frank Celenza - Drums
 Dave Descenzo - Drums 
 John DeChristopher - Strings, Cymbals, Stick 
 Suze DeMarchi - Guitar, Vocals 
 Tony Italia - Drums 
 Dave Leslie (Rankin) - Guitar, Vocals
 Mike Levesque - Drums
 Bill O'Meara - Strings, Cymbals, Stick 
 Eddie Parise - Bass, Vocals
 Anthony J Resta - Programming & Synthesizers
 Jake Shapiro - Cello
 Oksana Solovieva - Violin

References

1999 debut albums
Suze DeMarchi albums
Mushroom Records albums